Fly Tales is an animated comedy television series that was made in 1999. It featured the short adventures of a young, curious, friendly fly. The fly would get into sticky situations in settings such as a kitchen, a museum, a gumball machine, etc. but always somehow manages to escape. The show was often shown on Cartoon Network at 5 o'clock in the morning after The Magic Roundabout and before Flying Rhino Junior High, in the UK; the show is also often referred to as an animated sitcom and also had re-runs on Channel 4 in the UK during the early to mid 00's where it would also air at early hours on weekends. The series also aired in the United States on Fox Family Channel. The series is based on a French comic book originally by Lewis Trondheim called La Mouche.

Episodes

References

External links
 Official website
 

1999 Canadian television series debuts
2001 Canadian television series endings
Canadian children's animated adventure television series
1990s French animated television series
2000s French animated television series
1999 French television series debuts
2001 French television series endings
French children's animated adventure television series
Teletoon original programming
Animated television series about insects
Television series based on French comics
Television series by Mattel Creations
Television shows set in France
Television shows filmed in Montreal
Fox Family Channel original programming
Animated television series without speech